Kengtawng or Kyaingtaung was a Shan state in what is today Burma. The capital was the town of Keng Tawng. The state formed the eastern part of Mongnai State and was separated from it by a mountain range running from north to south averaging  in height. Kengtawng was watered by the Nam Teng River that run through most of the state.

History
Kengtawng was a vassal state or dependency of Mongnai State. According to legend Keng Tawng was the town of Khun Sam Law, the hero of an ancient origin myth of the Shan people. However, the early records of Mongnai State are vague and most of Kengtawng's history is obscure.

Late 19th century notorious usurper and warmonger Twet Nga Lu was born in Kengtawng. He was an unfrocked monk whose ambitions and crafty schemes were at the root of widespread bloodshed and destruction in the region in those times. Twet Nga Lu also caused much desolation in his own native state. According to Sir George Scott:

Rulers
There is no information about the rulers of Kengtawng state.

See also
Mong Nai

References

Shan States